The 2nd Sarasaviya Awards festival (Sinhala: 2වැනි සරසවිය සම්මාන උලෙළ), presented by the Associated Newspapers of Ceylon Limited, was held to honor the best films of 1964 in Sinhala cinema on July 1, 1965, at the Asoka Cinema, Colombo, Sri Lanka. Governor William Gopallawa was the chief guest at the awards night.

It is noteworthy that this year's awards will be replaced by special merit awards and no awards will be given in the categories of screenwriting, editing, music direction and art direction. The film Getawarayo won the most awards with eight including Best Film.

Awards

References

Sarasaviya Awards
Sarasaviya